III is the third studio album from the French metal band Eths, released on 6 April 2012. The release date was delayed from its initially intended release date of 2 March (Europe) and 12 March (North America). The album features a move towards more clean singing from frontwoman Candice Clot as well as versions of songs with either French or English lyrics, plus the return of drummer Guillaume Dupré. A music video for the song Adonaï was released on 12 March in both French and English versions. It is the last album to feature vocalist Candice Clot, who announced her departure from the group in September 2012. 3 videos have been released from this album: "Adonaï" (for both English and French versions), "Sidus" (with live vocalists Virginie Goncalves and Nelly Wood-Hasselhoff) and "Harmaguedon" (with new vocalist Rachel Aspe).

The songs "Gravis Venter" and "Adonaï", in their original French versions, were released for the Rock Band Network in May 2012.

Track list
Note: Tracks "Voragine", "Adonaï", "Gravis Venter" and "Anatemnein" have alternate lyrics which differ between English and French versions

Personnel

Eths
Candice Clot − Lead vocals
Stéphane "Staif" Bihl − Guitar, Keyboards, Additional Vocals on "Inanis Venter"
Grégory "Greg" Rouvière − Guitar
Damien Rivoal − Bass
Guillaume "Yom" Dupré - Drums, Percussion

Choir
Naïra Abrahamyan - Soprano
Marie-Hélène Beignet - Mezzo-Soprano
Pierre Rodriguez - Tenor
Patrick Alliote - Baryton-Bass

Production
Orchestral parts performed by FILMharmonic Orchestra Prague
Fredrik Nordström - production, mixing
Henrik Udd - mixing

References

2012 albums
Eths albums
Albums produced by Fredrik Nordström